Supersax was an American jazz group, created in 1972 by saxophonist Med Flory and bassist Buddy Clark as a tribute to saxophonist Charlie Parker. The group's music consisted of harmonized arrangements of Parker's improvisations played by a saxophone section (two altos, two tenors, and a baritone), rhythm section (bass, piano, drums), and a brass instrument (trombone or trumpet).

History
Notable brass soloists that recorded with the group included Conte Candoli (trumpet), Frank Rosolino (trombone) and Carl Fontana (trombone). On the group's recordings their music was tightly orchestrated, with arrangements by Flory that contained little or no calls for improvisation (although members of the band would often solo at live performances).

Saxophonist Warne Marsh was a member in the first edition of the group, and although he was never given freedom to solo on any officially released materials, Lee Konitz has stated that there are bootleg tapes of the group where Warne played a solo.

They won the Grammy Award for Best Jazz Performance by a Group in 1974. They were also part of the Grammy-nominated 1983 recording Supersax & L.A. Voices, Volume 1, in which the L.A. Voices were nominated for Best Jazz Vocal Performance - Duo Or Group. Med Flory also wrote the vocal arrangements for this recording.

Discography
 Supersax Plays Bird (Capitol, 1973)
 Salt Peanuts: Supersax Plays Bird Vol. 2 (Capitol, 1974)
 Supersax Plays Bird with Strings (Capitol, 1975)
 Chasin' the Bird (MPS, 1977)
 Dynamite!! (MPS, 1979)
 Supersax & L.A. Voices: L.A. (Columbia, 1983)
 Supersax & L.A. Voices Vol. 2 (CBS, 1984)
 Supersax & L.A. Voices Vol. 3: Straighten Up and Fly Right (CBS, 1986)
 Stone Bird (Columbia, 1988)
 Live in '75: The Japanese Tour (Hindsight, 1998)
 Live in '75: The Japanese Tour Vol. 2 (Hindsight, 1999)

References

External links

Med Flory/Supersax collection, 1972-1987 at the Library of Congress

American jazz ensembles
Tribute bands
Grammy Award winners
Pausa Records artists
Columbia Records artists
Capitol Records artists
MPS Records artists